Tincknell is a surname. Notable people with the surname include:

Colin Tincknell (born 1953), Australian politician
Harry Tincknell (born 1991), British racing driver
James Tincknell (born 1988), British rugby union player

English-language surnames